Kunming, also known as Yunnan-Fu, is the capital and largest city of Yunnan province, China. It is the political, economic, communications and cultural centre of the province as well as the seat of the provincial government. The headquarters of many of Yunnan's biggest corporations are based in the city. The city was of great significance during World War II as a Chinese military center, American air base, and transport terminus for the Burma Road. As of 2020 census, Kunming had a total population of 8,460,088 inhabitants, of whom 5,604,310 lived in its built-up (or metro) area made of all urban districts but Jinning, not conurbated yet. It is at the northern edge of Dian Lake, surrounded by temples and lake-and-limestone hill landscapes.

Kunming consists of an old, previously walled city, a modern commercial district, residential zones and university areas. It is also one of the top 200 cities in the world by scientific research output. The city has an astronomical observatory, and its institutions of higher learning include Yunnan University, Kunming University of Science and Technology, Yunnan University of Finance and Economics, Kunming Medical University, Yunnan Normal University, Yunnan Agricultural University and Southwest Forestry University. On the northeast mountainous outskirt is a bronze temple dating from the Ming dynasty, the largest of its kind in China.

Kunming's economic importance derives from its geographical position, as it shares a border with various Southeast Asian countries, serving them as a transportation hub in Southwest China, linking by rail to Vietnam and by road to Burma, Laos and Thailand. This positioning also makes the city an important commercial center of trade in the region. 
The city also acts as a gateway to Southeast Asia and South Asia, the Kunming Changshui International Airport is one of the top 40th-busiest airports in the world. Kunming also houses some manufacturing, chiefly the processing of copper, as well as various chemicals, machinery, textiles, paper and cement. Kunming has a nearly 2,400-year history, but its modern prosperity dates only to 1910, when the railway from Hanoi was built. The city has continued to develop rapidly under China's modernization efforts. Kunming's streets have widened while office buildings and housing projects develop at a fast pace. Kunming has been designated a special tourism center and as such sports a proliferation of high-rises and luxury hotels.

Etymology 
The name "Kunming" evolved from an ancient ethnicity named Kunming Yi or Kunming Barbarian, which was a branch of Di-Qiang. The Kunming Yi lived in the neighbouring region of Erhai Lake during the Western Han dynasty. The Han dynasty incorporated the territory of the Dian Kingdom and set a division called Yizhou Commandery in 109 BC; the Han dynasty also incorporated the Kunming Yi into Yizhou Commandery soon after. Therefore, Kunming Yi expanded east to the Lake Dian area later. "Kunming" has acted as a place name since the Three Kingdoms period, but the reference was not clear because this ethnicity occupied a large region. In the Yuan dynasty, the central government set "Kunming County" in modern Kunming; the name "Kunming" has continued to this day.

Some modern research states that the name "Kunming" of Kunming Yi is a cognate word of "Khmer" and "Khmu" that originally meant "people".

History

Early history 

Kunming long profited from its position on the caravan roads through to South-East Asia, India and Tibet. Early townships in the southern edge of Lake Dian (outside the contemporary city perimeter) can be dated back to 279 BC, although they have been long lost to history. Early settlements in the area around Lake Dian date back to Neolithic times. The Dian Kingdom, whose original language was likely related to Tibeto-Burman languages was also established near the area.

Dian was subjugated by the Chinese Han dynasty under the reign of Emperor Wu of Han in 109 BC. The Han dynasty incorporated the territory of the Dian Kingdom into their Yizhou Commandery, but left the King of Dian as the local ruler.

The Han dynasty (205 BC–AD 220), seeking control over the Southern Silk Road running to Burma and India, brought small parts of Yunnan into China's orbit, though subsequent dynasties could do little to tame what was then a remote and wild borderland. During the Sui dynasty (581–618), two military expeditions were launched against the area, and it was renamed Kunzhou in Chinese sources.

Medieval China 

Founded in 765, Kunming was known to the Chinese as Tuodong city in the Kingdom of Nanzhao (737–902) during the 8th and 9th centuries. Tuodong later became part of the successor Kingdom of Dali (937–1253). The possession of Tuodong changed hands when the city came under the control of the Yuan dynasty invasion of the southwest in 1252–1253. During the reign of provincial governor Ajall Shams al-Din Omar, a "Chinese Style" city named Zhongjing Chen was founded where modern Kunming is today. Shams al-Din ordered the construction of Buddhist temple, a Confucian temple, and two mosques in the city. The Confucian temple, doubling as a school, was the first of its kind in Yunnan, attracting students from minority groups across the province. Coupled with his promotion of Confucian ceremonies and customs, Shams al-Din has been largely credited with the sinicization of the region. The city grew as a trading center between the southwest and the rest of China. It is considered by scholars to have been the city of Yachi Fu (Duck Pond Town) where people had used cowries as cash and ate their meat raw, as described by the 13th-century Venetian traveler Marco Polo.

Ming and Qing dynasties 

In the 14th century, Kunming was retaken from Khan Mongolian control when the Ming dynasty defeated the Yuan dynasty, later building a wall surrounding present-day Kunming. 300 years later, Ming General Wu Sangui defected to Manchu invaders and held the city until his death in 1678, long after the rest of China had fallen under Manchu rule. During the beginning of Qing rule, the entirety of Yunnan and Guizhou were ruled from Kunming and Wu. During the Revolt of the Three Feudatories, the seat of Wu's newly declared Zhou dynasty was moved to Hengzhou, Hunan. Later in 1678 when Wu died, his grandson Wu Shifan resisted the Qing for two more months before committing suicide, thereby reverting control of the city back into Qing hands. During the Ming and Qing dynasties, it was the seat of the superior prefecture of Yunnan.

The area was first dubbed Kunming in the period towards the decline of the Yuan dynasty and later still in 1832, the beginnings of a real city were acknowledged within the city walls and significant structures within their confines. Founding of the city can therefore be said to have been a predominantly 19th century affair. It was also in this century that the city grew to become the major market and transport centre for the region.   Many of the city's inhabitants were displaced as a result of the 1833 Kunming earthquake.

The rebel leader Du Wenxiu, the Muslim Han Sultan of Dali, attacked and besieged the city several times between 1858 and 1868. A great part of the city's wealth did not survive the 1856 Panthay Rebellion, when most of the Buddhist sites in the capital were badly damaged, converted to mosques or razed. Decades later, Kunming began to be influenced by the West, especially from the French Empire. In the 1890s, an uprising against working conditions on the Kunming–Haiphong rail line saw many laborers executed after France shipped in weapons to suppress the revolt. The meter-gauge rail line, only completed by around 1911, was designed by the French so that they could tap Yunnan's mineral resources for their colonies in Indochina.

Kunming was a communications center in early times and a junction of two major trading routes, one westward via Dali and Tengchong County into Myanmar, the other southward through Mengzi County to the Red River in Indochina. Eastward, a difficult mountain route led to Guiyang in Guizhou province and thence to Hunan province. To the northeast was a well-established trade trail to Yibin in Sichuan province on the Yangtze River. But these trails were all extremely difficult, passable only by mule trains or pack-carrying porters.

After Qing dynasty 
"In the late 1800s, the French started to build the Kunming-Haiphong railway for trade and shipping of weapons".

Kunming reverted to county status in 1912, under the name Kunming, and became a municipality in 1935.  The opening of the Kunming area began in earnest with the completion in 1906–1910 of the Yunnan-Vietnam Railway to Haiphong in north Vietnam (part of French Indochina).

Kunming became a treaty port opening to foreign trade in 1908 and soon became a commercial center. A university was set up in 1922. In the 1930s the first highways were built, linking Kunming with Chongqing in Sichuan and Guiyang in Guizhou to the east.

The local warlord General Tang Jiyao established the Wujiaba Aerodrome in 1922; an additional 23 airports would be established in Yunnan from 1922 to 1929.

Second World War (1937-1945) 
Kunming was transformed into a modern city as a result of fighting of the Second Sino-Japanese War/World War II in 1937 with the outbreak of the Battle of Shanghai, Nanking and Taiyuan, forcing a great movement of refugees from the north and eastern coastal regions of China, bringing much commerce and industry into the southwest of China, including Kunming. They carried dismantled industrial plants with them, which were then re-erected beyond the range of Japanese bombers.  In addition, a number of universities and institutes of higher education were evacuated there. The increased trade and expertise quickly established Kunming as an industrial and manufacturing base for the wartime government in Chongqing. 

As the battles of Shanghai, Taiyuan and Nanjing were lost by the end of 1937, and with the Battle of Wuhan falling into Japanese occupation by the end of 1938, many more of China's military forces and civilians retreated to cities outside the reach of the Japanese military ground forces a year prior to the outbreak of the Second World War in Europe in 1939, including the relocation of the Chinese Air Force Academy from Jianqiao Airbase to Kunming's Wujiaba Airbase, where the airfield was vastly expanded, becoming the new training hub for the battered but regrouped Chinese Air Force in which Lieutenant General Claire Lee Chennault took command of cadet training duties in the summer of 1938. The Chinese Air Force command established the 41st Pursuit Squadron based in Kunming, also known as the French Volunteer Group squadron in June 1938, and with them they brought Dewoitine D.510 fighters, with the intention of securing the sale of the planes to the Chinese Air Force; the French participated in some combat engagements against Japanese raids, including dogfights against Mitsubishi A5M fighters with Chinese Hawk III fighters over Nanchang, but after several setbacks, including a fighter pilot KIA, the group was disbanded in October 1938.

Although the Empire of Japan was focusing on ending the Chinese war of resistance at the Battle of Chonqing and Chengdu, Kunming was not out of the reach of Japanese air raids, and faced attacks by IJAAF and IJNAF bombers; military assets and infrastructure were under regular attack, while the RoCAF 18th Fighter Squadron and units of the Air Force Academy at Wujiaba were tasked with aerial defense of Kunming. The city of Kunming was prepared as an alternate National Redoubt in case the temporary capital in Chongqing fell, with an elaborate system of caves to serve as offices, barracks and factories, but never utilised. Kunming was to have served again in this role during the ensuing Chinese Civil War, but the Nationalist garrison there switched sides and joined the Communists. Instead Taiwan would become the last redoubt and home of the Republic of China government; a role it fulfills to this day.

When the city of Nanning fell to the Japanese during the Battle of South Guangxi, China's sea-access was cut off. However, the Chinese victory at the Battle of Kunlun Pass kept the Burma Road open. When the Japanese began occupying French Indochina in 1940, the Burma Road that linked Kunming and the outside-world with unoccupied China grew increasingly vital as much of the essential support and materials were imported through Burma. After the attack on Pearl Harbor, and the start of the Pacific War in December 1941, Kunming acted as an Allied military command center, which grouped the Chinese, American, British and French forces together for operations in Southeast Asia. Kunming became the northern and easternmost terminus of the vital war-supply line into China known as "The Hump. The Office of Strategic Services' Service Unit Detachment 101 (predecessor to the 1st Special Forces Group) was also headquartered in Kunming. Its mission was to divert and disrupt Japanese combat operations in Burma.

Kunming was increasingly targeted by the IJAAF when the Burma Road was lost to the Japanese, and the 1st American Volunteer Group, known as the "Flying Tigers", based in Kunming, and tasked with defense of The Hump supply-line that stretched over the Himalayas between the British bases in India to port-of-entry Kunming against Japanese aerial interceptions; China's primary lifeline to the outside world, which had included the Burma Road and the Ledo Road, all with Kunming as the northern terminus.

Industry became important in Kunming during World War II. The large state-owned Central Machine Works was transferred there from Hunan, while the manufacture of electrical products, copper, cement, steel, paper, and textiles expanded.

 After World War II 
Until 1952, Kunming was a walled city. The city government in 1952 ordered hundreds of young people to tear down the wall and use its bricks to make a new road running north–south. To show its appreciation for the young people that demolished the east wall, the city government named the new street after them. The existence of the walls still echoes today at place names like Xiao Ximen and Beimen Jie. There are also less obvious connections to the wall, such as Qingnian Lu, in the location of Kunming's east wall.

After 1949, Kunming developed rapidly into an industrial metropolis with the construction of large iron and steel and chemical complexes, along with Chongqing, Chengdu and Guiyang in the southwest. A Minorities' Institute was set up in the 1950s to promote mutual understanding and access to university education among Yunnan's multiethnic population. The city consolidated its position as a supply depot during the Vietnam War and subsequent border clashes. Until Mao Zedong's death, in much of the rest of the country Kunming was still generally thought as a remote frontier settlement.
Accordingly, the government utilized Kunming as a place where to exile people who had fallen politically out of favor, especially during the Cultural Revolution.

In 1957, Kunming's rail link to Hanoi was re-opened (after being cut during World War II). It was cut again in 1979.

Since the economic reforms of the mid-1980s, Kunming has enjoyed increased tourism and foreign investment, for instance investors from Thailand trace their ancestries back to Yunnan. Several Thai Chinese banks have offices in Kunming, for example, Kasikorn Bank and Krung Thai Bank. Princess Maha Chakri Sirindhorn of Thailand has visited Kunming many times to study Chinese culture and promote friendly relations. 

Rail link to Vietnam re-opened again in 1996.

In July 2005, the second Greater Mekong Subregion (GMS) Summit was held in Kunming, with government leaders from China, Laos, Myanmar (Burma), Thailand, Cambodia, and Vietnam participating. There, China agreed to lend its neighbors more than $1 billion for a series of projects. China was then promoting GMS cooperation as a first step toward building an eventual China-ASEAN Free Trade Area.

Infrastructure improvements have been underway to improve links between Kunming and Southeast Asia in time for the 2010 China-ASEAN Free Trade Area. The FTA is expected to make Kunming a trade and financial center for Southeast Asia. In addition to physical improvements to enhance Kunming's trade with Southeast Asia, the central and provincial governments have made financial preparations to assist the city's emergence. At the end of 2004, the central government approved Kunming to be one of the 18 mainland cities in which foreign banks could conduct business in renminbi. 

In the 1980s and 1990s, the city center was rebuilt, with Swiss help, in its current 'modern' style to impress visitors attending the 1999 World Horticultural Exposition. It was primarily during 1997 and 1998 that much of the city's roads, bridges and high rises were built.

The World Horticultural Expo was widely regarded as a public relations success for Kunming. Today the after-effects of the Expo are apparent in more than just the physical improvements to the city—it was the Expo that made the outside world take notice of Kunming, which was relatively unknown at the time.

In July 2006, talks at the ASEAN Regional Forum, China, Bangladesh and Myanmar (Burma) agreed to construct a highway from Kunming to Chittagong through Mandalay for trade and development.

On 1 March 2014, 29 people were killed, and more than 130 were injured at Kunming Railway Station in a terrorist attack.

 Geography 

Kunming is located in east-central Yunnan province.

Situated in a fertile lake basin on the northern shore of the Lake Dian and surrounded by mountains to the north, west, and east, Kunming has always played a pivotal role in the communications of southwestern China. Lake Dian, known as "the Pearl of the Plateau", is the largest lake in Yunnan and the sixth largest fresh water lake in China.

It is part of the larger karst-based landscape of the area.

 Climate 
With its perpetual spring-like weather which provides the ideal climate for plants and flowers, Kunming is known as the "City of Eternal Spring". The weather has seldom reached high temperatures in summer, only exceeding  on a handful of occasions. However, freak snowfalls occur in occasional winters. The city is covered with blossoms and lush vegetation all-year round. The period from May to October is the monsoon season and the rest of the year is dry. With monthly percent possible sunshine ranging from 30% in July to 69 percent in February and March, the city receives 2,198 hours of bright sunshine annually.

 Natural resources 

Mineral resources include phosphorus, salt, magnesium, titanium, coal, quartz sand, clay, silica, copper. Phosphorus and salt mines are the most plentiful. Kunyang Phosphorus Mine is one of the three major phosphorus mines in the country. Dongchuan is a major copper production base.

Geothermal resources are widely distributed.

 Environment and horticulture 

Kunming is a significant horticultural center in China, providing products such as grain, wheat, horsebeans, corn, potato and fruit such as peaches, apples, oranges, grapes and chestnuts.  Kunming is world-famous for its flowers and flower-growing exports. More than 400 types of flowers are commonly grown in Kunming. The camellia, Yulan magnolia, azalea, fairy primrose, lily and orchid are known as the six famous flowers of the city.

The camellia was confirmed by the Municipality of Kunming as its city flower in 1983.

The Kunming city government plans to create an environmental trial court to deal with environment-related lawsuits. It is to be part of the city's intermediate people's court and will have jurisdiction over appeals by companies that have been found guilty of violating environmental laws in cities throughout Yunnan.

 Demographics 

Of the more than five million people registered as residents in Kunming in 2006, around four million are Han. The Yi people are the most prominent minority in the city, with more than 400,000 residents. The least-represented ethnic minority in Kunming were the 75 Dulong people living in the city.

Registered ethnic populations of Kunming :

 Han: 4,383,500
 Yi: 400,200
 Hui: 149,000
 Bai: 73,200
 Miao: 46,100
 Lisu: 17,700
 Zhuang: 14,000
 Dai: 13,200
 Hani: 11,000
 Naxi: 8,400
 Manchu: 4,800
 Buyei: 3,400
 Mongol: 2,500
 Lahu: 1,700
 Tibetan: 1,500
 Yao: 1,100
 Jingpo: 1,100
 Va: 1,000
 Blang: 441
 Primi: 421
 Sui: 294
 Achang: 263
 Nu: 156
 Jino: 135
 Derung: 75

 Cityscape 

The city center has three major squares and five major streets: Jinma Biji Square, Nanping Square and Dongfeng Square along with Nanping Jie, Jinbi Lu, Renmin Lu, Zhengyi Lu and Jingxin Jie. Qingnian Lu, Zhengyi Lu, and Renmin Lu are the main commercial areas in Kunming; the most popular pedestrian streets are Nanping Jie, Jingxing Birds-Flowers' Market, and Jinma Biji Fang.

Kunming's public focus is the huge square outside the now-demolished Workers' Cultural Hall at the Beijing Lu-Dongfeng Lu intersection, where in the mornings there are crowds doing taijiquan and playing badminton. Weekend amateur theatre are also performed in the square. Rapidly being modernized, the city's true center is west of the square across the adjacent Panlong River (now more of a canal), outside the Kunming Department Store at the Nanping Lu/Zhengyi Lu crossroads, a densely crowded shopping precinct packed with clothing and electronics stores. The river receives sewage and wastewater from surrounding pipes. Surrounding the area are plenty of new high-rises.

The center is an area of importance to Kunming's Hui population, with Shuncheng Jie, one of the last old streets in the center of the city, previously forming a Muslim quarter. Until shortly before 2005, this street was full of wind-dried beef and mutton carcasses, pitta bread and raisin sellers, and huge woks of roasting coffee beans being stirred with shovels.  Under Kunming's rapid modernisation, however, the street has been demolished to make way for apartments and shopping centers. Rising behind a supermarket one block north off Zhengyi Lu, Nancheng Qingzhen Si is the city's new mosque, its green dome and chevron-patterned minaret visible from afar and built on the site of an earlier Qing edifice.

Running west off Zhengyi Jie just past the mosque, Jingxing Jie leads into one of the more bizarre corners of the city, with Kunming's huge Bird and Flower Market convening daily in the streets connecting it with the northerly, parallel Guanghua Jie. The market offers many plants such as orchids that have been collected and farmed across the province. In the small grounds of Wen Miao, a now vanished Confucian temple off the western end of Changchun Lu, there is an avenue of pines, an ancient pond and pavilion, and beds of bamboo, azaleas and potted palms. 

Jinbi Lu runs roughly parallel to and south of Dongfeng Lu, reached from Beijing Lu. Two large Chinese pagodas rise in the vicinity, each a solid thirteen stories of whitewashed brick crowned with four iron cockerels. The West Pagoda was built between 824 and 859, during the Tang dynasty; its original counterpart, the East Pagoda, was built at the same time, but was destroyed by an earthquake in 1833 and rebuilt in the same Tang style in 1882.  South down Dongsi Jie, past another mosque, the entrance to the West Pagoda is along a narrow lane on the right. In the tiny surrounding courtyard, sociable idlers while away sunny afternoons playing cards and sipping tea in the peaceful, ramshackle surroundings. The East Pagoda is a more cosmetic, slightly tilted duplicate standing in an ornamental garden a few minutes' walk east on Shulin Jie. The temples associated with both pagodas are closed to the public.

 Parks 

Cuihu Park (Green Lake Park) is one of Kunming's major parks and is predominately a lake surrounded by greenery. Located in the west side of the park is the statue of one of Yunnan's most famous patriots—Nie Er, the composer of China's national anthem. Now it is open to public for free.

Daguan Park lies on Dian Chi in Kunming's southwestern limits. Originally laid out by the Kangxi Emperor in the Qing dynasty, it has been modified over the years to include a noisy funfair, food stalls and emporiums, and is a favourite haunt of Kunming's youth.

Kunming's zoo, founded in 1950, is adjoined to Yuantong Park. The zoo houses 5,000 animals from 140 species and receives 3 million visitors a year.

Other parks in Kunming include Black Dragon Pool, and the Kunming Botanical Gardens in the north, and Wenmiao Tea Garden in Wuhua District.

 Landmarks 

From 1 May to 31 October 1999, Kunming held the 1999 World Horticulture Exposition, with the theme of "Man and Nature—Marching Toward the 21st Century".

Constructed in 1602 (the 30th year of the Wanli reign period of the Ming dynasty), all of its beams, pillars, arches, doors, windows, tiles, Buddhist statues, and horizontal inscribed boards are made of copper, weighing more than 200 tons. It is the largest copper building in China.

Notable museums in Kunming:
 Yunnan Provincial Museum
 Kunming City Museum (redeveloped in 2014)
 Kunming Natural History Museum of Zoology (opened in November 2006)
 Yunnan Ethnology Museum (opened 1995)

Yuantong Si is Kunming's major Buddhist temple. It is Kunming's largest and most famous temple with the original structure being first constructed more than 1,200 years ago during the Tang dynasty. The temple sits in a depression on the southern side of Yuantong Park. Numerous Buddhist temples line the road to the Dragon Gate in the Western Mountains.

 Administrative divisions 

The prefecture-level city of Kunming has jurisdiction over 14 subdivisions; seven districts, one county-level city, three counties and three autonomous counties.

Kunming is bounded by Qujing City to the east, Honghe Hani and Yi Autonomous Prefecture to the southeast and Yuxi City to the southwest, Chuxiong Yi Autonomous Prefecture to the west and Zhaotong City to the northeast. Kunming also borders with Panzhihua prefecture level city and Liangshan Yi Autonomous Prefecture of Sichuan province.

Kunming plans to add two new districts to its existing four urban districts (Panlong, Wuhua, Guandu, Xishan) over the next few years.

 Society and culture 

 Leisure and entertainment 

Within Kunming, the entertainment district has its focus around Kundu Square, with many cinemas, bars, clubs and restaurants. Food aside, one feature of less formal Yunnanese restaurants is that they often have a communal bamboo water pipe and tobacco for their customers.  There are plenty of student bars and clubs. The city has several operatic troupes and indigenous entertainments which include huadeng, a lantern dance. Although indoor performances are lacking, there are often informal shows at the weekend outside the Workers' Cultural Hall and in Cuihu Park. There are similar shows at the Yunnan Arts Theater on Dongfeng Xi Lu. Kunming's main cinema house is on the south side of the Dongfeng Lu/Zhengyi Lu intersection. The other main multiplex, the XJS, at the junction of Wenlin Jie and Dongfeng Xi Lu.

 Language 

The Kunming dialect is very similar to that of Sichuan and Guizhou but uses the third tone much less than standard Chinese. Many terms are used only in Kunming dialect, such as "" meaning 'terrific'.

The pronunciations of certain Chinese characters are very different from Mandarin Chinese. For example, " (fish)" would be pronounced as "yi" in Kunming dialect instead of "yu" in Mandarin Chinese; " (street)" would be pronounced as "gai" instead of "jie".

When someone speaks Mandarin Chinese with a strong Kunming accent, it'll be called Mapu, short for Majie (a place in Kunming) Mandarin Chinese.

The Kunming Dialect is slowly dying due to it being 'informal' and is being replaced by Mandarin Chinese. Sometimes this is called dirt language or slum language (土话)

 Tourism 

Kunming attracts domestic and foreign tourists year-round. At the center of Yunnan and as its capital, Kunming is also a transport hub for tourists heading to other parts of Yunnan such as Dali, Lijiang and Shangrila.

Conference and exhibition venues in Kunming include the Kunming International Convention and Exhibition Center and the Yunnan Provincial Science and Technology Hall.

Kingdom of the Little People, a theme park featuring performers with dwarfism, is also located near Kunming.

Other famous attractions include Stone Forest and Yunnan's Ethnic Village.

 Sports 

Every year, many Chinese and international athletes come to Kunming for high-altitude training. The city has been China's national high-elevation training base for more than 30 years. There are two major training complexes, Hongta Sports Center and Haigeng National Training Center.

Hongta Sports Center was built in 2000 by Hongta (Red Pagoda) cigarette company, at a cost of US$58 million. Located near Haigeng Park, the complex is mostly used by professional athletes, but also acts as a sports club for the general public. Every weekend, it hosts amateur football matches. Aside from about 10 football pitches, including one surrounded by a running track, Hongta also has a  swimming pool, a badminton gymnasium, tennis courts and a basketball court. It also has one of China's few ice hockey rinks, and a workout room with treadmills and weightlifting machines. There are also game rooms for air hockey; also pool tables and a basement bowling alley. The complex comes complete with a 101-room hotel and restaurant.

Haigeng National Training Center is located ten minutes away from Hongta on Dianchi (Lake Dian) near Kunming's award-winning Lakeview Golf Club and new condominium developments. This complex dates from the late 1970s and was built by the government specifically to specialize in high-altitude training.

 Golf 

Golf is a major attraction in Kunming. There are four golf courses within an hour's drive of downtown. For the last six years , Spring City Golf and Lake Resort in nearby Yiliang County has reigned as the best golf course in China and Hong Kong according to US Golf Digest. In 2004, it was named Asia's best golf resort by Asian Golf Monthly. It hosts the Kunming Leg of the Omega China Tour.

Kunming has attracted foreign investment in golf course development. "Spring City" Golf Resort is a US$600 million project that began as an investment led by Singapore's Keppel Land Group in 1992. Jack Nicklaus and course designer Robert Trent Jones, Jr designed the two courses.

 Sport facilities 

Major sports facilities include:
 Tuodong Sports Center, a multi-purpose venue
 Golf: Spring City Golf and Lake Resort, its 'Mountain Course' was designed by Jack Nicklaus
 Lakeview Golf Villa
 Cuihu Park tennis courts
 Kunming Municipal Athletic Center
 Kunming Gymnasium
 Yunnan Provincial Stadium, home to Hongta Yunnan Football Club
 Wuhua District Stadium

 Economy 

Kunming has three economic advantages over other cities in southwest China: significant natural resources, a large consumer market and a mild climate. Due to its position at the center of Yunnan, one of China's largest producers of agricultural products, minerals and hydroelectricity, Kunming is the main commercial hub for most of the province's resources.

Kunming's chief industries are copper, lead and zinc production. Its iron and steel industry has been expanded. Salt and phosphate mines around Kunming are some of the largest in China. Yunnan Copper Company Limited, based in Kunming, is one of Yunnan's largest mining corporations. From the late 1970s, Kunming's main industries also came to include food and tobacco processing and the manufacture of construction equipment and machines. 

In May 1995, the State Council approved Kunming as an Open City. By the end of 1995, the city had approved 929 overseas-funded enterprises with a total investment of $2.3 billion including $1.1 billion of foreign capital. More than 40 projects each had an investment of more than $9 million.

Kunming is a center of engineering and the manufacture of machine tools, electrical machinery, equipment and automobiles (including heavy goods vehicles). It has a chemical industry, and plastics, cement works and textile factories. Its processing plants, which include tanneries, woodworking and papermaking factories, use local agricultural products. In 1997, Yunnan Tire Co. opened a tire plant in Kunming, with a capacity to produce two million tires per year. 

 Development zones 

Kunming has two major development zones, Kunming High-tech Industrial Development Zone (biological medicine, new materials, electronic information, photoelectron, agriculture) and Kunming Economic and Technology Development Zone (mechanical equipment production, biological science and food industry, information industry, software).

 Industrial parks 

There are 30 key industrial parks promulgated and recognized by National Development and Reform Commission in Yunnan Province.

The largest include:
 Chenggong Industrial Park
 Anning Industrial Park
 Songming Yanglin Industrial Development Zone
 Dongchuan Special Industrial Park
 Xundian Special Industrial Park
 Kunming Haikou Industrial Park.

 Companies 

, Kunming is home to 65 of the Top 100 Enterprises in Yunnan Province. The top 100 enterprises were based on their revenues for 2007. Hongta Group, with revenues of some RMB39.88 billion for 2007 topped the list. The tobacco sector remains the largest sector in the province.

 Flower industry 

Yunnan has developed into the largest flower export base in Asia, with many Dutch experts having transferred technology to the area. The Dounan Flower Market, located in suburban Kunming, is the largest in China with daily sales of 2.5 million yuan (US$300,000) from the 2 million sprays of flowers. The provincial government agency, the Yunnan Flower Association, regulates the industry.

 Logistics 

Kunming East Station is at present Yunnan province's only container handling depot, with direct links to only three provinces; Guangdong, Guizhou and Sichuan. It also has direct access to the metropolitan district of Chongqing.

The Jiaying Depot is connected with the new system of highways built linking Yunnan to the increasingly important markets of Southeast Asia, facilitating cheap Chinese exports to the region and granting resource-poor China greater access to the region's massive raw material resources. Yunnan has thereby become a progressively important area in the Southwest's rail logistics both in terms of national and international logistics.

 Solar energy 

In July 2008, Kunming began to implement a program to transform the city's solar energy industry into a US$8.8 billion industrial base in China by 2013. Kunming receives an annual average sunshine of more than 2,400 hours. Each 1 kW PV system has the potential to generate 1500 kilowatt-hours of electricity a year from solar energy. 

, the Kunming Economic Committee listed about 130 solar energy enterprises in the city. Of these, 118 enterprises produce solar lamps and solar water heaters, with a combined total production value of about US$43.8 million, and 10 enterprises are engaged in solar photovoltaic cells manufacturing, with a total production value of about US$51.2 million.

Suntech Power announced in December 2008 that it was jointly constructing a solar energy project with Yunnan Provincial Power Investment and other investors. The 1MW first-phase of the Shilin 66MW on-grid solar power station began generating power on 28 December 2009. The initial phase of the 66MW project was originally scheduled to start production in first half of 2010 while the 20MW second phase and 36 MW third phase were under construction.

 Transport 

Kunming is situated on the Yunnan–Guizhou Plateau. Rail and air are the main two methods to travel to or from Kunming from outside Yunnan.

 Air transport 

Kunming has air connections with several Chinese and Southeast Asian cities.

The now defunct Yunnan Airlines was headquartered in Kunming until it was acquired by China Eastern Airlines. China Southwest Airlines used to operate routes to and from Kunming, until it was merged with Air China.

Lucky Air is a budget airline based in Kunming and operates scheduled services from Dali to Kunming and Xishuangbanna, and plans to expand to other areas of China.

Currently, the longest non-stop flight from Kunming is to Paris, France, operated by China Eastern Airlines since 18 December 2014.

 Highway 

China National Highways 108, 213 and 320 intersect in Kunming. Highways link Kunming to Thailand, Vietnam and Laos, and provide Yunnan province access to seaports of Southeast Asia.

 Rail 

Kunming is the main rail hub of Yunnan province. The Chengdu–Kunming railway from Sichuan, Shanghai–Kunming railway from Guizhou, and Nanning–Kunming railway from Guangxi converge in Kunming from the north, northeast and east. The Yunnan–Vietnam Railway runs from Kunming southeast to Hekou and Lao Cai on the Sino-Vietnamese border and then on to Haiphong The Kunming–Yuxi railway runs south to Yuxi, where a second rail line to Vietnam is being planned and built. To the west of Kunming, the Guangtong–Dali railway extends off the Chengdu–Kunming Line to Dali (Xiaguan Town).

Kunming has three major railway stations:
Kunming railway station is at the southern end of Beijing Xi Lu. Compared with the other railway station (North Railway Station), Kunming Railway Station services most of the "conventional" (not high-speed) trains to places to other provinces of China. Trains run north to Chengdu, southeast via Xingyi to Baise and Nanning in Guangxi, and east through Guizhou, via Liupanshui, Anshun, Guiyang, into the rest of the country.
Kunming South railway station, opened at the end of 2016, is located in Chenggong District, many miles southeast from the historical city center. It is the western terminal of the Shanghai–Kunming high-speed railway and the Guangzhou–Nanning–Kunming high-speed railway, and has high-speed service to destinations along these lines and elsewhere on the nation's high-speed network.
Kunming North railway station (serviced by the No. 23 Bus) is on the heritage  Kunming–Hai Phong Railway, which runs to Hekou and Vietnam. Most of the station has been converted into a museum. Due to the deterioration of the railway line, the long distance narrow-gauge service has been cancelled; however, some local narrow gauge service still operates at Kunming North Railway Station, in particular two daily trains to Shizui Station on the western outskirts of Kunming, and to Wangjiaying east of the city.

As of 2017, railway development projects continue to proceed in the Kunming metropolitan area. In February 2017, the railway authorities announced that a connector between the new Kunming South railway station and the old Kunming railway station (also known as the Nanyao Station) will open by the end of 2017, making it possible for some high-speed train to serve Kunming railway station as well.

 Urban rail plan 

In May 2010, Kunming began construction on its first urban rail lines, line 1 and 2 of the Kunming Metro. An elevated test section had been under construction since 2009. Parts of lines 1 and 2 opened in April 2014. Construction on line 3 began in August 2010 and the Phase 1 was completed in 2018.

 High-speed rail plan 
Kunming will be the hub and terminus for the "Pan Asia High Speed Network" using high-speed trains to connect China, Cambodia, Laos, Myanmar, Thailand, Malaysia and Singapore.

Completed but under trial high-speed railways:

 Kunming–Shanghai. The construction completed on 16 June 2016. It goes through 6 provincial capital cities: Shanghai, Hangzhou, Nanchang, Changsha, Guiyang and Kunming. As estimated it would take 3 hours from Shanghai to Nanchang, 2.5 hours from Hangzhou to Nanchang, 4 hours from Kunming to Changsha, 8 hours from Kunming to Hangzhou and 9 hours from Shanghai to Kunming. It is expected to start operating on 30 December 2016.

Construction is underway for the following high-speed railways:

 Kunming–Shanghai. The speed will be .
 Kunming–Nanning. The speed will be .
 Kunming–Vietnam via Honghe Prefecture.
 Kunming–Singapore via Laos, Thailand, and Malaysia.

Study or planning is being done for the following railways:

 Kunming–Chengdu. The speed will be .
 Kunming–Chongqing. The speed will be .
 Intercity rail will connect three neighboring cities: Qujing, Chuxiong, and Yuxi. The line to Chuxiong will then be extended to Dali. The speed will be .
 Kunming to Kolkata, India via Myanmar
 Kunming to Kyaukphyu, Myanmar.

 Road and transit 

Yunnan has built a comprehensive highway system with roads reaching almost all the major cities or towns in the region. Bus travel across the region is extensive. Buses head from Kunming to destinations such as Dali and Lijiang several times a day.

There are four major long-distance bus stations in Kunming with the South Bus Station and Railway Square Bus Station being the most primary.
 South Bus Station faces the Kunming Railway Station in Beijing Xi Lu, with standard, luxury, express and sleeper buses departing for all over Yunnan and neighboring provinces.
 Railway Square Bus Station is smaller than SBS and the majority of the buses depart from the station are private-run. Usually no fixed schedules are available and buses will leave when they are full. There are standard and sleeper services to Dali, Jinghong and elsewhere in Yunnan.

Leaving China by road into Vietnam and Laos is also possible through the respective crossings at Hekou in southeastern Yunnan or Bian Mao Zhan in Xishuangbanna.

The Kunming–Bangkok Expressway is the first expressway from China to Bangkok via Laos.

At the 14th Greater Mekong Subregion Ministerial Conference in July 2007, China, Laos and Thailand signed an agreement on the construction of a new bridge over the Mekong River to connect Chiangkhong in Thailand and Ban Houayxay in Laos, to the Kunming–Bangkok Highway. The completion of the new bridge over the Mekong River will help connect China's southeast provinces with Bangkok. With capital investments from both China and Thailand, the bridge is expected to be completed in 2011 and will be the last link in the highway system that winds through the Mekong River region.

 Local transit 

Public buses and taxis are the two main means of transport within the city. A metro system is currently under construction (see Kunming Metro).

Nearly two hundred public bus lines crisscross the city center, covering the whole prefecture.

Cycling is common, and many hotels around the Kunming Railway Station provide bicycle rental services.

Conscious of its growing traffic issues, the city is currently renovating a pedestrian-friendly city centre.

 Central Kunming 

The far end runs out of the city as Renmin Xi Lu, the first leg of the Burma Road. Most of the city's famous hotels and foreign consulates lies along Dongfeng Dong Lu and the southern half of Beijing Lu, while the majority of specific landmarks and shopping district are north and west of the center around Dongfeng Xi Lu and Cuihu Park (Green Lake Park). Circling most of this is the city's first highway ring road, Huancheng Lu, though others are planned.

 Education and research 

Kunming remains a major educational and cultural center in the southwest region of China, with universities, medical and teacher-training colleges, technical schools, and scientific research institutes.

 Colleges and universities 

 Kunming Medical University
 Kunming Metallurgy College
 Kunming University
 Kunming University of Science and Technology (1925)
 Southwest Forestry University
 Yunnan Agricultural University
 Yunnan Arts University
 Yunnan Normal University
 Yunnan Normal University Business School
 Yunnan University (1922)
 Yunnan University of Finance and Economics
 Yunnan Nationalities University
 Yunnan University of Traditional Chinese Medicine

 Yunnan University 
Yunnan University, located in Kunming, is one of the largest and the most prestigious universities in China and is the only university in Yunnan province which has been developed into a "National Key University". It was founded in 1922, as "University of the Eastern Land". Its name has been changed six times subsequently.  The institution has 17 schools on the local campus and 3 independent schools located in other cities.  It claims the largest and best law school in Yunnan province.

 Yunnan Normal University 
Yunnan Normal University was founded in 1938 as the National Normal College of Southwestern Union University. In 1946, when some faculties returned to the north of China, it changed its name to National Kunming Normal College.  It now as 6 campuses in Kunming itself and other cities.  With 22 schools, it has an enrollment of some 33000 undergraduate students.

 Kunming University of Science and Technology 
Kunming University of Science and Technology was established in 1954 and was given "key university" status in 2010.  In 2017, it had 3 campuses in Kunming housing 24 schools and had an enrollment of 27000 undergraduates.

 Yunnan Nationalities University 
Yunnan Nationalities University was founded in 1951 as Yunnan Nationalities College.  It is now one of six "key" universities in the province.  It has established cooperative relations with 26 foreign universities including University of Bergen in Norway, La Trobe University in Australia, and University of Virginia in the United States.  The university has a Nationalities Museum, which contains more than 20000 rare exhibits. There are more than 23000 undergraduates on campus.

 Huayang Academy 
Huayang Academy is a specialist Chinese language training centre considered unique for offering training Kunming dialect as well as standard Mandarin.  Its locality is a popular centre of Western culture in Kunming, attracting numerous foreign-owned businesses.

 Management training 

The Shanghai-based China Europe International Business School, aka CEIBS, will launch in 2009 its Business Development Certificate Programme in Kunming. With the Business Development Certificate Programme, CEIBS and program partner Frankfurt School of Finance & Management aim to train approximately 500 Chinese managers in the coming four years, with the first phase of the program beginning in 2008 in Hefei, the capital of Anhui province. Kunming and Harbin will be the focus of the program's expansion in 2009. The program is part of a two million Euro umbrella project funded by the EU, which also includes another program that provides scholarships for MBA students from China's less-developed regions.

 Research institutes 
 Solar Energy Research Institute of Yunnan Normal University
 Kunming Municipal Planning and Design Research Institute

 Chinese Academy of Sciences 

The Kunming Branch of the Chinese Academy of Sciences (CAS) was established in 1957. It was formerly known as Kunming Office of CAS and was promoted and renamed into a branch in 1958. In 1962, Yunnan Branch combined with Sichuan Branch and Guizhou Branch to establish Southwest China Branch of CAS in Chengdu. In October 1978, Kunming Branch was reestablished at the approval of the State Council.

As a working department of CAS, Kunming Branch now administers five research institutes:

 Kunming Institute of Botany, Chinese Academy of Sciences
 Kunming Institute of Medical Biology, Chinese Academy of Sciences
 Kunming Institute of Zoology, Chinese Academy of Sciences
 Kunming Primate Research Center, Chinese Academy of Sciences
 Xishuangbanna Tropical Botanical Gardens in Menglun, Mengla County, Xishuangbanna Dai Autonomous Prefecture, far southern Yunnan.

At present, it has a total staff of 1,160, of whom 808 are professional researchers, seven are academicians and 343 are senior researchers. There are also 447 PhD degree students and 530 master's degree students. The retired staff is 1,090. The Branch has set up three national key open labs, two CAS key open labs, five key labs set up by CAS and local province, three engineering centers, five doctoral sites, five post doctoral stations and national famous plant herbariums and halls of wildlife specimens and has a series of up-to-date research instruments and apparatus, computer networks and biodiversity information systems. The Branch has become an advanced comprehensive science research base in astronomy, geology and biology.

 Libraries 
 Yunnan Provincial Library

 Twin towns and sister cities 

Kunming currently maintains sister city agreements with the following foreign cities.

On April 2020, The City of Wagga Wagga council voted to cut ties with its sister city Kunming city, a week later they would vote again joining Kunming as a sister city. 

 Health 

Currently, there are 2,774 medical institutes of various kinds and 33,600 medical professionals in the city. The 170 medical service institutes based on communities cover a population of 1.86 million. China Health Management Corp (CNHC) is the main private healthcare provider in the city. It has been predicted that private hospitals will provide 70 percent of total medical health care services by 2012 within Kunming City.

Hospitals in Kunming include:
 Yunnan Provincial Red Cross Hospital and Emergency Center, is the main general hospital in Kunming.
 Yunnan Provincial First People's Hospital
 First Affiliated Hospital of Kunming Medical College
 Kunming Mental Hospital, founded in 1955, houses over 400 patients.
 Kunming Physical Rehabilitation Center

 HIV/AIDS 

In late 2006, China's first provincial-level HIV/AIDS treatment center was built. The center has six main departments: clinical treatment, technical consulting, research and development, international exchange and cooperation, clinical treatment training and psychological therapy.

Yunnan, with a population of more than 45 million, leads China in HIV/AIDS infections: primarily spread through intravenous drug use and unsafe sex, often involving the sex industry. According to official statistics, by the end of 2005, Yunnan was home to more than 48,000 HIV-infected patients, 3,900 patients with AIDS and a death toll of 1,768.

 Military 

Kunming is headquarters of the 14th Group Army of the People's Liberation Army, one of the two group armies that comprise the Chengdu Military Region responsible for the defense of China's southwestern borders with India and Myanmar, as well as security in Tibet.

 Public security and crime 
The headquarters of the Kunming Municipal Public Security Bureau is on Beijing Lu. Its foreign affairs department, located on Jinxing Huayuan, Jinxing Xiao Lu in the northeast of the city, handles immigration and travel visas.

 Drug trafficking 

Kunming has a pivotal role as a major conduit point in international drug trafficking as it is the closest major Chinese city to the Golden Triangle in Southeast Asia. The Kunming Municipal Public Security Bureau Narcotics Squad is the specialist counter-narcotics police service.

Police confiscated at least three tons of drugs in Yunnan in 2005. Yunnan province seized 10 tons of illegal drugs in 2006, accounting for 80 percent of the total drugs confiscated nationwide during the period, according to Sun Dahong, then deputy director of Yunnan's provincial Public Security Bureau. The total is more than double the amount seized in the province in 2005.

Heroin and methamphetamine seem to be the main targets of the 30,000+ strong anti-drug police in Yunnan. The majority of heroin coming into China from the Golden Triangle passes through Dali from where it is then distributed to the rest of China and internationally via China's coastal cities.

Kunming Municipal Compulsory Rehabilitation Center in Kunming is the main rehabilitation center for drug addicts, mostly recovering from heroin addiction. International drug rings have used Yunnan and Kunming to channel new synthetic drugs (like methamphetamine) as well as traditional drugs like heroin.

Opium was until recently in widespread medicinal use by many of the minority peoples of the province; however, after the Opium War the Chinese government has made growing the poppy illegal, and all but stamped out its production within the borders of Yunnan.

 International relations 

The following countries have a diplomatic mission in Kunming:
 Consulates:
 Bangladesh
 Cambodia
 Myanmar (Burma)
 Laos
 Malaysia
 Thailand
 Vietnam
 Trade offices:
 Australia
 Netherlands

 Notable residents 
Notable people from Kunming include:

 Benedict Anderson, scholar (born in Kunming)
 Cai Xitao, botanist
 Chih-Kung Jen, physicist
 Wang Xiji, aerospace engineer and recipient of the "Two Bombs, One Satellite" Meritorious Award
 Pierre Jean Marie Delavay, 19th-century French missionary, lived and died in Kunming
 Lamu Gatusa, professor and writer
 He Yunchang, Chinese performance artist born in Kunming whose early, seminal works were also performed there
 Li Weiwei, Olympics handball player
 Liu Fang, pipa player
 Maran Brang Seng, Burmese politician (died in Kunming)
 Ma Yashu, actress
 Nie Er, composer (born in Kunming)
 Frank Shu, Chinese-American astrophysicist, born in Kunming
 Xing Ruan, Chinese-Australian author and architect, born in Kunming
 Song Wencong, aerospace engineer and aircraft designer
 Tang Jiyao, general and warlord of Yunnan, died in Kunming
 Tong Yao, actress
 Tu Wei-ming, ethicist (born in Kunming)
 Wang Hongni, triathlete and Asian Games gold medallist
 Wen Yiduo, poet and scholar, (lived and assassinated in Kunming)
 Anthony Zee, physicist
 Zhang Xiaogang, artist, born in Kunming
 Zheng He, Ming dynasty explorer
 Zhu De, military leader (studied in Kunming)
 Zhu Youlang (Ming dynasty emperor), (fought and was executed in Kunming)
Diplomats:
 Auguste François, French consul in south China
 George Soulié de Morant, French diplomat
 John S. Service, American diplomat served in Kunming for two years

National Southwestern Associated University:
 Chen Ning Yang, physicist
 Chen Yinke, linguist
 Feng Youlan, philosopher
 Shiing-Shen Chern, mathematician
 Ta-You Wu, physicist
 Tsung-Dao Lee, physicist
 Wang Yuan, mathematician
 Wu Ningkun, professor emeritus
 Zhang Boling, founder of Nankai University

 See also 

 2008 Kunming bus bombings
 3650 Kunming, an asteroid
 :Category:Films set in Kunming
 Zheng He
 List of cities in the People's Republic of China
 List of twin towns and sister cities in China

 References 

 Further reading 

 Kunming Statistical Yearbook-2007  China Statistics Press .
 
 
 Sustainable Urban Development – the Case Study of Kunming, China Willy Schmid, Markus Eggenberger, 1997.
 NSL – Network City and Landscape – contains Kunming sustainable development papers
 
 
 
 
 Chin, K. and Zhang, S. "Street-Level Heroin Sales in Kunming, China". American Society of Criminology (ASC) 2008-06-26
 Kunming Communiqué on Cross-border Collaboration for Drug Demand Reduction and HIV/AIDS Prevention Social Development Division, United Nations ESCAP
 Kobusingye KA. "Voluntary counseling and testing among injecting drug users in Kunming city, Yunnan Province" Int Conf AIDS. 2004 Jul 11–16; 15: abstract no. WePeC5999.
 "China's Disabled Get Helping Hand in High Places" Kunming Journal. Nicholas D. Kristof. 30 May 1991
 Book about Kunming's regional cooperation with Southeast Asia: ASEAN-China Relations: Realities and Prospects (2005) Saw Swee Hock, Lijun Sheng, Sheng Lijun, Kin Wah Chin, Chin Kin Wah. Institute of Southeast Asian Studies (ISEAS) 
 Wei Xing. "Prevalence of ethnic intermarriage in Kunming: Social exchange or insignificance of ethnicity?" Asian Ethnicity, Volume 8, Issue 2 June 2007, pages 165–179
 Jianli Li; Mary Francis Marx. "A Survey of Four Libraries in Kunming: Library Automation and Modernization in a Far Removed Province in China" Journal of Southern Academic and Special Librarianship'' (2000)

External links 

 Official Kunming Municipal Government Website 
 Official Kunming Website  
 

 
765 establishments
8th-century establishments in China
Cities in Yunnan
National Forest Cities in China
Populated places established in the 8th century
Provincial capitals in China
Tourism in Yunnan